The Cleveland Metroparks Zoo aka Cleveland Zoological Park is a  zoo in Cleveland, Ohio. The Zoo is divided into several areas: Australian Adventure; African Savanna; Northern Wilderness Trek, The Primate, Cat & Aquatics Building, Waterfowl Lake, The RainForest, and the newly added Asian Highlands. Cleveland Metroparks Zoo has one of the largest collections of primates in North America, The Zoo is a part of the Cleveland Metroparks system.

The Cleveland Metroparks Zoo was founded in 1882. It is one of the most popular year-round attractions in Northeast Ohio by attendance with a 2% increase from the previous year to 1.2 million visitors in 2007, compared to the Cleveland Guardians who were the most popular attraction in Northeast Ohio in 2007 with a total attendance of over 2.2 million.

History 
The Zoo, originally named the Cleveland Zoological Park, first opened in 1882 at Wade Park where the Cleveland Museum of Art now stands. During its early years, the Zoo only held animals of local origin. In 1907, the city of Cleveland moved the Zoo to its current location in Old Brooklyn, and the Zoo acquired its first elephant. Beginning in 1910, the Zoo constructed Monkey Island, sea lion pools, and a moated bear exhibit. By 1940, the Zoo was home to three elephants and its first (permanent) elephant resident since 1924. That same year, the Cleveland Museum of Natural History assumed control of the Zoo.

Between 1955 and the transfer of management to the Cleveland Metroparks in 1975, the Zoo experienced rapid expansion despite setbacks due to flooding: the Zoo's reptile collection and several other buildings were lost when Big Creek overflowed in January 1959. Although the Zoo had recovered by 1962, it would not have another permanent reptile collection until the opening of the RainForest thirty years later. Ostrich races proved popular in 1965 and 1966 and a large public swimming pool sat on the grounds from 1930 until the 1960s.

Construction began on the Primate & Cat Building in 1975 (the Aquatics section would be added in 1985), later followed by the RainForest in 1992, Wolf Wilderness in 1997, Australian Adventure in 2000, and the Sarah Allison Steffee Center for Zoological Medicine in 2004. Newer exhibits include the Asian highlands and Tiger Passage opened in 2017 and 2018, and The Rhino Reserve was completed in 2020.

The Zoo's official website states that it currently has 3,000 animal residents representing more than 600 different species.

Building/attraction history 
The following is a timeline of when selected buildings and exhibits were created:

 1882: Cleveland Zoological Park opens at Wade Park (now University Circle)
 1884: Wade Hall is built
 1907: Cleveland's City Council moves the Zoo to its current location; the Cleveland Museum of Art is built
 1934: Monkey Island is completed
 1956: Pachyderm Building is built
 1970: Wade Hall is moved to its current location on the shore of Waterfowl Lake
 1975: Construction began on the Primate & Cat Building
 1985: Aquatics portion of the Primate & Cat Building is added 
 1992: The RainForest is completed 
 1997: Wolf Wilderness is completed 
 2000: Australian Adventure is completed
 2004: Sarah Allison Steffee Center for Zoological Medicine opens
2008: Pachyderm building closes to make room for African Elephant Crossing
 2011: African Elephant Crossing opens
2015: Ben Gogolick Giraffe Encounter opens
 2016: Rosebrough Tiger Passage opens
 2018: Asian Highlands opens
2019: Monkey Island is demolished to make way for Rhino Reserve
2020: Rhino Reserve opens
2021: Eagle Zip Adventure opens

Leadership Emeritus, Cleveland Metroparks Zoo (CMZ)

Distinguished Emeritus Staff (CMZ)

National Zoo Association Awarded Cleveland Metroparks Zoo Staff with Honorary Memberships
Retired Cleveland Metroparks Zoo administrators and career zoo and aquarium professionals Daniel Moreno and Donald Kuenzer were recognized as Honorary Membership Winners by the Association of Zoos and Aquariums. Recipients of Honorary Membership are recognized as the most esteemed and distinguished zoo professionals in North America.

According to the AZA website, Honorary Membership is conferred by the AZA Board of Directors upon those AZA members who have made "significant contributions to the zoological profession during their careers."

Moreno and Kuenzer are included in a list of other notable North American zoo and aquarium professionals. Other recipients include William G. Conway, Hon. PhD (Director General/President Emeritus, Bronx Zoo-based Wildlife Conservation Society), Lester Fisher, DVM (Veterinarian/Director Emeritus, Lincoln Park Zoo), Murray Fowler, DVM (Veterinarian/Professor, University of California), Jack Hanna, Hon. PhD (Director Emeritus, Columbus Zoo and Aquarium), Charles H. Hoessle, Hon. PhD (Director Emeritus, Saint Louis Zoo), Marvin Jones (Registrar Emeritus, San Diego Zoo), Peter Karsten (Director Emeritus, Calgary Zoo), Edward Maruska, (Director Emeritus, Cincinnati Zoo and Botanical Garden), Dennis Meritt, Jr., Ph.D. (Professor/Assistant Director Emeritus, Depaul University/Lincoln Park Zoo), George B. Rabb, PhD (President/Director Emeritus, Brookfield Zoo), Alan H. Shoemaker, MS (Curator Emeritus, Riverbanks Zoo), Kurt Benirschke, MD (Board of Trustees, San Diego Zoo), Gary K. Clarke (Director Emeritus, Topeka Zoo), Roger Conant, Hon ScD (Curator Emeritus, Toledo Zoo) and Ted A. Beattie (President/Director Emeritus, Shedd Aquarium).

Daniel Moreno
Dan Moreno joined the Cleveland Metroparks Zoo after serving three decades at the helm of the Cleveland Aquarium as both its director and curator under the auspices of the Cleveland Museum of Natural History. The Cleveland Aquarium's animal collection was "absorbed" by the Cleveland Metroparks Zoo in 1986 after structural elements of the aquarium building forced its closing.

Until his retirement in 1997, Moreno managed the aquatic animal collections at the Cleveland Zoo under General Curator Don Kuenzer. He supervised animal husbandry programs for the Rainforest and Aquatics exhibits. Moreno was a charter member of the Association of Zoos and Aquariums (originally the American Association of Zoological Parks and Aquariums) and served on its board of directors from 1971 to 1976.

In 2012, the Greater Cleveland Aquarium opened to the public as the only free standing aquarium in the state of Ohio.

Donald Kuenzer
Don Kuenzer retired after a 40-year career serving in multiple capacities, including senior curator, general curator and acting director. In 1961, Kuenzer began his career at the Cleveland Zoo's Petting Farm as an attendant animal care technician. After serving as an animal keeper, he was promoted to Assistant General Curator in 1975 by zoo director Dr. Leonard Goss.

Kuenzer was credited with designing The Rainforest, a state-of-the art indoor naturalistic living exhibit dedicated to the display of tropical and subtropical species from multiple continents. He served on the Board of Regents for the Association of Zoos and Aquariums.

Past directors/directors emeritus, Cleveland Metroparks Zoo

Leonard Goss, DVM, PhD (7th director)
Dr. Goss (1913-1999) was a veterinary pathologist and retired from the Cleveland Zoo (later renamed the Cleveland Metroparks Zoo) as its director in 1979. Prior to assuming the director position in Cleveland, he was the fourth chief veterinarian at the New York Zoological Society's Bronx Zoo as well as assistant director of the Bronx Zoo. Dr. Goss was President of the AZA and twice Vice-President.

At the Bronx Zoo, which is the headquarters for the Wildlife Conservation Society (WCS), Goss conducted clinical, epidemiological and pathological research in collaboration with eminent field zoologist George Schaller. Schaller was the Director of the Bronx Zoo's Animal Research and Conservation Center, which is now referred to as the Wildlife Conservation Society's Global Conservation Program.

The Cleveland Zoo has since made efforts to replicate this type of collaborative research relationship as demonstrated by Drs. Goss and Schaller in the 1970s and more recently by Atlanta, Chicago (Lincoln Park & Brookfield), National, San Diego, and Saint Louis zoos.

In the mid and late 1990s General Curator Hugh Quinn hired Patricia McDaniels as the first of three successive curators for the Cleveland Metroparks Zoo's Science and Conservation section. The unit now has a veterinary epidemiologist on staff. Sharon Deem, DVM, PhD Dipl. ACZM (now with the Saint Louis Zoo), was the first formally trained epidemiologist on staff and was both a researcher and experienced clinician from the National Zoo.

When Dr. Goss, a graduate of the Cornell University and The Ohio State University veterinary colleges returned to Ohio to assume the role as director of the Cleveland Zoo, he continued to conduct research in zoological medicine and related animal science disciplines. Goss was a president of the board of directors of the Association of Zoos and Aquariums (previously the "American Zoo and Aquarium Association", and originally the "American Association of Zoological Parks and Aquariums").

Michael Vitantonio (8th director)
Michael "Mike" Vitantonio was hired as the eighth director of the Cleveland Zoo in its 130 plus year history.

Steve H. Taylor, BS (9th director)
Inspired by the TV show Zoorama, zoo director emeritus Steve H. Taylor began his zoo career in 1972 as an animal keeper at the Los Angeles Zoo.  According to his website, he is now a "Zoo Consultant and Entertaining Speaker".

Taylor continues to advise zoos, including the Akron Zoo as both a professional consultant and member of its board of trustees. He also served on the board of directors of the Association of Zoos and Aquariums. Prior to moving to Ohio, Taylor was the director of the 5-hectare Sacramento Zoo.

Taylor resigned as director of the 5-hectare zoo in Sacramento to accept the directorship of the 70-hectare zoo in Cleveland. In his memoirs, published in a newsletter, Taylor described the Cleveland Metroparks Zoo to be poorly managed and "undistinguished" when he assumed the position as its 9th director. He credits himself for improving the conditions for both animals and staff over his 24-year career in Cleveland.

Exhibits 

The Cleveland Metroparks Zoo is divided into several bio-thematic areas that house animals from different regions of the world. Each area is themed for the particular region of the world they represent, although the older areas (such as the Primate, Cat & Aquatics Building) are less thematic than those that were constructed more recently. Upon entering, visitors arrive in the Welcome Plaza which features administrative buildings, an amphitheater, food court, and the Zoo's largest souvenir shop. Numerous smaller concession/souvenir stands are located throughout the park.

Aside from walking, Zoo patrons may opt to ride the "ZooTram" line which shuttles visitors between the Welcome Plaza (near African Elephant Crossing) and the Primate, Cat & Aquatics Building.

The RainForest 
The RainForest, opened in 1992, is one of the most popular exhibits at the Cleveland Metroparks Zoo. The RainForest boasts more than 10,000 plants and over 600 animals from the tropical regions of Asia, Africa, and the Americas. The opening of the RainForest also introduced the Metroparks Zoo's first permanent reptile collection since the flooding in 1959.

The RainForest is housed in a large glass and granite building, just outside the main entrance to the Zoo. The structure is divided into an outer ring—featuring an assortment of tropical plants, exhibits containing small mammals, a cafeteria, and a gift shop—and an inner area that contains the principal animal exhibits. Animal habitats are located on both floors of the RainForest. The exhibits contained on the ground floor are collectively known as the "Lower Forest", and those on the second floor are known as the "Upper Forest".

Upon entering the RainForest, visitors are immediately greeted by a cascading,  waterfall and a large tropical garden that soars upwards two stories. The wall behind the waterfall resembles Ancient Mayan ruins. Within the wall are a series of exhibits featuring small, New World mammals such as Pied tamarins, Geoffroy's tamarins, White fronted marmosets and endangered golden lion tamarins. The outer ring of the RainForest is also home to a wide variety of tropical plants including lancepods, balsam apples, tropical almonds, lipstick trees, numerous varieties of orchid, a kapok tree, and the rare titan arum (corpse flower). The central exhibit, called "Tropical Rain Storm", is a lifelike recreation of a rainforest island where simulated tropical rainfall occurs periodically. The island is inhabited by several Cape porcupines.

The major animal of the Rainforest is the Bornean orangutan, of which the zoo has five: males Tiram and Zaki and females Kera Wak, Kayla, and Merah. Zaki is the most recent Orangutan baby at the zoo, born in 2021 to Tiram and Kera Wak.

Animals contained in the RainForest include: Binturongs, Red-rumped agoutis, Straw-coloured fruit bats, Rodrigues flying foxes, giant anteaters, capybaras, scarlet ibis, prehensile-tailed porcupines, White faced whistling ducks, Leafcutter ants, Ocelots, Clouded leopards, Luzon bleeding-hearts, Green poison frogs, Tentacled snake, Fiji banded iguana, Green tree python, Roseate spoonbills, Yellow-spotted river turtles, Asian small-clawed otters, François' langurs, fishing cats, dwarf crocodile, and gharials as well as invertebrates, amphibians and turtles.

African Savanna 
The African Savanna area is located near the park entrance. Visitors can observe African lions, flamingos, giraffes, zebras, bontebok, a variety of African birds, eastern black rhinos, and colobus monkeys. the African elephant crossing contains elephants and meerkats. On February 7, 2018, a baby rhino, named Lulu, was born to parents Forrest and Kibbibi. On August 20 of the same year, another baby rhino, named Nia, was born to parents Forrest and Inge.

The Sarah Allison Steffee Center for Zoological Medicine

As part of Cleveland Metroparks Zoo's focus on conservation, the Zoo constructed the Steffee Center for Zoological Medicine in September 2004. The center hosts medical, laboratory and surgical suites, in addition to a ward and quarantine area. Its veterinary hospital is equipped with the first CT scanner for use in a zoo hospital. Located in a nearby pavilion is the Reinberger Learning Lab, where Zoo patrons can learn about veterinary care at every stage of an animal's life. The Learning Lab offers interactive, hands-on educational displays as well as views into surgical suites where visitors may observe treatment procedures in progress.

African Savanna and Ben Gogolick Giraffe Encounter

Consisting of several large yards, the African Savanna features a variety of mammals and birds. The exhibit houses animals such as Masai giraffes, Grant's zebras, bonteboks, ostriches, white-backed vultures as well as several species of African storks and geese. In 2015, the Ben Gogolick Giraffe Encounter was completed, and visitors are now able to purchase leaves to feed the giraffes.

African Elephant Crossing

In 2011, the Zoo opened its new elephant exhibit, African Elephant Crossing. At a total cost of $25 million, the state of the art habitat quadrupled the elephants' living space, allowing the zoo to increase its number of African elephants from three, to a herd of eight to ten. The exhibit features two large ranges—the Savanna and the Mopani—spread out over several acres. The ranges include deep ponds so that the elephants can swim, as well as expanded sleeping quarters. Areas of the ranges are also heated to maximize the elephants' habitat during the winter months. Periodically throughout the day, the elephants are shepherded across the pathway between the ranges, allowing visitors an up-close view of the animals. In addition to expanding the number of African elephants, the African Elephant Crossing exhibit introduced Meerkats, naked mole rats, an African rock python, and several species of birds.

Australian Adventure 
 
The Australian Adventure area is an  exhibit designed to resemble the Australian outback. It is home to wallaroos, kangaroos, emus and wallabies that roam freely throughout Wallaby Walkabout. Dingoes are also housed in this area along with two aviaries one for a kookaburra and another for a Barn owl. Zoo patrons can learn how sheep are sheared at Kookaburra Station, and experience up-close encounters with Southdown sheep, goats, Alpacas and other farm animals in the adjoining Contact Yard. The Australian Adventure is also home to a  Yagga Tree, which contains animal exhibits and a snake slide for younger visitors. Due to Northeast Ohio's inclement winters, Australian Adventure is weather dependent in the colder months.

Gum Leaf Hideout

Located in Koala Junction, Gum Leaf Hideout is home to the zoo's collection of bettongs, koalas, and Matschie's tree-kangaroos. The exhibit also features interactive displays that teach visitors about the devastating effects of deforestation on Australian ecosystems.

Reinberger Homestead

Modeled after a traditional 19th-century sheep station, the Reinberger Homestead offers Zoo visitors a look into Australian home life. The area contains animatronics of a koala and kookaburra, who speak about the culture.

Wallaby Walkabout and Boomerang Railway

Designed to replicate the Australian outback, Wallaby Walkabout features winding paths that visitors share with kangaroos, Red-necked wallabies, and Common wallaroos during the months of April through October. The landscape includes vegetation intended to be consumed by the animals. Families can also take a train ride through the exhibit. In July 2007, the Zoo fell under scrutiny from PETA after a one-year-old kangaroo was struck and killed by the exhibit's "Boomerang Railway" train. In response, the Zoo quickly dismissed the employee who was operating the train, and installed a fence along the tracks to prevent future injuries from happening.

Yagga Tree

The artificial, 55 foot tall Baobab known as the Yagga Tree is the star of Australian Adventure. It contains exhibits for a prehensile-tailed skink, a cane toad, and a sugar glider, as well as another animatronic, this time a crocodile named Wooly Bill.

Wilderness Trek  
The Wilderness Trek area is home to cold climate animals such as Siberian tigers,  grizzly bears, Tufted deer, Reindeer, the endangered Persian onager, and Red-crowned cranes which remain active outdoors year-round. The California sea lion/harbor seal exhibits feature large pools for visitors to observe the animals at play. The Metroparks Zoo also contains one of the largest collections of bear species in North America, including grizzly bears, Andean bears, Malayan sun bears, North American black bears, and sloth bears. On January 14, 2019, a female sloth bear named Shive gave birth to a female cub named Shala. Shala was the first sloth bear cub born at the zoo in 30 years.

Wolf Wilderness
 
Wolf Wilderness gives visitors a comprehensive look into the environment and wildlife of a northern temperate forest. Wolf Lodge, which anchors the exhibit, serves as an education and viewing center for gray wolves, beavers, and a variety of wetland species. Wolf Wilderness is one of the principal North American habitats at the Cleveland Metroparks Zoo. The exhibit opened in 1997 and consists of the Wolf Lodge, a large woodland enclosure for the wolves, a 65,000-gallon pond, and panoramic viewing rooms.

Visitors access the exhibit through the Wolf Lodge, a  building that is modeled after a 19th-century fur trading post. Upon entering, visitors arrive in the welcome center, which offers information on the indigenous animals of North America's deciduous forests and wetlands; this room leads into the two main exhibit areas.

The first exhibit room is dedicated to the six Mexican gray wolves contained in a vast, wooded area directly behind the Wolf Lodge. Zoo patrons are able to observe the wolves through a large viewing room with floor-to-ceiling windows, which look out into the habitat. Surveillance cameras within the enclosure are linked to monitors in the viewing room, allowing visitors to see the wolves even when they are out of direct view.

The viewing room leads into the second exhibit area—the wetlands and wolf display room. Here, visitors can observe both the wolves and several other North American animals through floor-to-ceiling windows, similar to the viewing room. Although visitors can also view the wolves from this room, the principal exhibits are the Canadian beaver habitat, the  freshwater pond, and the Zoo's collection of bald eagles. The Canadian beaver habitat features an artificial beaver dam with cross-sectional windows that grant visitors a chance to view the beavers' nest within. The freshwater pond is adjacent to the viewing windows, thereby creating an aquarium effect that allows visitors to see what a wetland pond looks like beneath the water's surface. The pond contains numerous fish indigenous to the North American wetlands.

Rosebrough Tiger Passage

Opened June 3, 2016, this exhibit features "four separate, interconnected habitat areas for the [zoo's] Amur tigers to roam", and includes "two overhead elevated pathways".

Asian Highlands

Asian Highlands opened June 12, 2018. This exhibit features expanded habitats for snow leopards, Amur leopards, Malayan tigers, and red pandas, and also includes Sichuan takins. on April 22, 2018, three snow leopard cubs were born.

Primate, Cat & Aquatics 
 Opened originally as the Primate & Cat Building in 1975, the Primate, Cat & Aquatics Building houses one of the largest collections of primate species in North America, including Western lowland gorillas, Müller's gibbons, Allen's swamp monkeys, Golden-bellied mangabeys (one of only twelve zoos currently displaying them),  Black howler, White-faced sakis, Bolivian gray titis, Ring-tailed lemurs, Red ruffed lemur, Mongoose lemurs and Crowned lemurs. Also next to the Gorillas is a nocturnal section containing Aye-ayes, Mohol bushbabies, and Pygmy slow lorises. Non primate species in the primate section include Fossas and Northern treeshrews. However, the building does not display the zoo's entire primate collection with some primates featured in the Rainforest and African Savanna.  

In 1985, the Cleveland Aquarium permanently closed and donated its collection of exotic fishes and invertebrates to the Metroparks Zoo. A section of the Primate & Cat building was renovated to accommodate the new Aquatics section, which currently features 35 salt- and freshwater exhibits include Australian lungfishes, a giant Pacific octopus, electric eels, and hundreds of living coral.

The Primate, Cat & Aquatics Building has also featured outdoor exhibits such as the outdoor section of the gorilla and golden bellied mangabey exhibits. The zoo's slowest resident, the Aldabra giant tortoise, can be found in the enclosure directly across from its fastest resident, the cheetah. Several of the tortoises are over one-hundred years old.

Waterfowl Lake 
The marshy shallows of Waterfowl Lake are home to Chilean flamingos, Black swan, Canvasback ducks, and trumpeter swans. During the summer months, Müller's gibbons and lemurs populate the lake's islands, and use ropes suspended above the water to navigate between them. Visitors can observe predatory birds such as Andean condors and Steller's sea eagles in-flight within towering, outdoor flight cages on the lake's eastern shore. The nearby Public Greenhouse contains hundreds of tropical plant species in addition to a seasonal butterfly exhibit. Waterfowl Lake is also the site of Wade Hall, one of the oldest zoo buildings in North America. Today, the hall serves as a Victorian ice cream parlor for Pierre's Ice Cream Company.

Notability and recognition

Recognition

Cleveland Metroparks Zoo Recognized Among Five "Best" Zoos in Ohio
The Cleveland Metroparks Zoo is one of five city zoos in Ohio. The 'Buckeye State' has been referred to as a "Zoo State", as only California rivals Ohio in the sheer number of options zoogoers have for visiting reputable zoos.

A 2014 "Top Ten" ranking of the nation's zoos by USA Today (based on data provided by the Association of Zoos and Aquariums) recognized the Cleveland Metroparks Zoo for being nominated for the USA Today award. Three other Ohio zoos were nominated and won awards for the 'Best US Zoo' contest: the Columbus Zoo and Aquarium, the Cincinnati Zoo and Botanical Garden and the Toledo Zoo.

Notable Animals

Timmy (Gorilla)
Arguably the most famous animal resident in the Cleveland Metropark Zoo's history, Timmy the Western lowland gorilla attained greater fame as a very prolific sire at the Bronx Zoo. Although, he was known as the "dud stud" at the Cleveland zoo, he proved to be quite virile after he arrived at the Bronx Zoo on loan. Timmy was managed indoors in human care for 25 years before being sent on breeding loan to the Wildlife Conservation Society's main campus and headquarters at the Bronx Zoo.

The move was highly controversial. The consideration of separating Timmy from his companion Kate, was met with much protest by animal rights activists and was the subject of a federal court case. Cleveland Metroparks Zoo Director Emeritus Steve H. Taylor cites the lawsuit surrounding the breeding loan as one of the most significant in the history of moderns zoos.

However, Timmy went on to sire more than 13 offspring in New York, many of whom were conceived in the Bronx Zoo's state-of-the-art Congo Gorilla Forest exhibit, which opened after his arrival in New York City.

Okpara
Sired by Timmy and born to Pattycake at the Bronx Zoo, Okpara returned to Cleveland before moving on to another facility.

Blackie
On January 13, 2014, the Cleveland Metroparks Zoo's Nile hippopotamus "Blackie", was euthanized at approximately 60 years of age. He formerly lived at the Pachyderm Building from 1955 until 2008. For the remaining years of his life, he lived at the zoo's private Africa barn in a two-room enclosure. Blackie may have been the longest-lived male Nile hippopotamus ever recorded in human care in North America. As far as hippos go, he had a gentle demeanor and weighed approximately 3700 lbs.

Aldabra Tortoises
The Zoo cares for three tortoises, including a pair of animals both exceeding 100 years of age.

Services and special events

Education and outreach
Cleveland Metroparks Zoo hosts day and overnight camps for children ages 5 to 14 during the summer months. The Summer Day Camp program teaches children about conservation and encourages understanding of the natural world. Overnight opportunities include stays in the Australian Adventure's Reinberger Homestead; stays in the Wolf Lodge, where guests can use the same tracking technology utilized by field scientists; and the African-themed "Rising Waters Safari Camp". Campers at Rising Waters stay in the zoo's African Savanna for an authentic safari experience complete with animal encounters. Each overnight program combines elements of Australian, Native American and African culture with an overarching theme of conservation.

Other educational opportunities include the Zoo's "Keeper for a Day" program, which is open to middle school, high school, and college students who are interested in a career working with animals. Similar to a job shadowing program, program participants spend a day working with animal professionals in the Zoo's Conservation Education Division. Participants are tasked with preparing meals, cleaning enclosures, conducting training exercises, and providing animals with enrichment items to stimulate them both mentally and physically.

The Cleveland Metroparks Zoo is a part of Miami University’s graduate-level Advanced Inquiry Program (AIP). The program offers a Master of Arts in Biology or Master of Arts in Teaching through online coursework and face-to-face experiential learning experiences at the zoo.

Conservation support
The zoo also offers numerous grant opportunities which fund research and conservation projects around the world. In 2011, the zoo and Zoological Society awarded grants to more than 90 field conservation projects and programs in 39 countries. Some of these projects include elephant conservation in southern Africa, studying gorilla ecology and behavior in central Africa, and anti-poaching initiatives for Asiatic freshwater turtles. Over the past ten years, the Cleveland Metroparks Zoo has supported more than 600 conservation projects in nearly 100 countries. Current initiatives include "Quarters for Conservation" and spreading awareness of the burgeoning Palm Oil Crisis in Malaysia and Indonesia.

Events
Boo at the Zoo

Cleveland Metroparks Zoo's annual fall event, "Boo at the Zoo", takes place in October. Visitors can observe the various cold weather animals that still roam outside, and are encouraged to wear costumes to the park. The Boo at the Zoo event is a safe Halloween option that offers animal shows, live performances, and other fall-related activities.

DINOSAURS!

During the summer months, the Zoo features prehistoric animals along the wooded path around Waterfowl Lake. Younger visitors have the opportunity to dig for "fossils" and learn about the field of paleontology. The 2007 and 2010 "DINOSAURS!" exhibits showcased dinosaurs from around the world: Tyrannosaurus rex, Stegosaurus, Triceratops, Pteranodon, Omeisaurus,  Dilophosaurus, Baryonyx, Iguanodon, Styracosaurus, Apatosaurus, Kentrosaurus, Brachiosaurus, Suchomimus and more. The 2013 "DINOSAURS!" exhibit featured 20 animatronic dinosaurs, including Quetzalcoatlus and Troodon.

Rentals
Stillwater Place

In Spring 2015, the Cleveland Metroparks Zoo opened a new reception event center, Stillwater Place. Offering scenic views of nearby Waterfowl Lake and a capacity of up to 300 guests, Stillwater Place is open year-round and caters to many occasions, such as weddings, birthdays, reunions and more.

Incidents
In 2015, Mitchelle Schwab was charged after allegedly dropping her 2-year-old son into a cheetah exhibit. His parents were finally able to retrieve him from the exhibit and was taken to MetroHealth Medical Center.

Notes

External links

Cleveland Metroparks Zoo entry at the Encyclopedia of Cleveland History

Zoos in Ohio
Culture of Cleveland
1882 establishments in Ohio
Parks in Cleveland
Tourist attractions in Cleveland
Zoos established in 1882